is an original Japanese anime television series produced by Lay-duce and Aniplex. It aired from April to June 2022.

Characters

Production and release
The anime project was revealed on August 28, 2021, during the "BS Eleven Keiba Chūkei" program in Japan, which was teased a week prior. The series is produced by Lay-duce and Aniplex and directed by Makoto Katō, with Team Fanfare writing the series' scripts, Naohiro Fukushima serving as the main writer, Hiro Kanzaki designing the characters, and Hiroyuki Sawano composing the music. It aired from April 2 to June 25, 2022, on Tokyo MX, BS11, GTV, GYT, MBS, and AT-X. The opening theme song is "Move The Soul" by JO1, while the ending theme song is "Outsiders" by SawanoHiroyuki[nZk] with JO1 members Junki Kono and Sho Yonashiro. The series will have 13 episodes. Crunchyroll has licensed the series outside of Asia. Plus Media Networks Asia licensed the series in Southeast Asia and will release it on Aniplus Asia.

Episode list

Music

The series' soundtrack was composed by Hiroyuki Sawano, and released on June 8, 2022 via Aniplex. The soundtrack also features several vocal tracks featuring performances by Benjamin, mpi and Misaki Umase.

Track listing

Reception
Fanfare of Adolescence has received generally mixed to negative reviews from critics. Teddy Cambosa of Anime Corner criticized the show's lack of focus on the horse racing aspects of the show as well as the writing of the storytelling and characters, calling it "All Idols, No Horse-Racing." Nicholas Dupree of Anime News Network shared similar sentiments, with him naming the show as the worst of the season it aired, stating "there's nothing about it I could describe as “good” outside of some isolated visuals courtesy of its talented director." Natsuki Hanae's acting also received criticism, with Teddy Cambosa of Anime Corner calling it "overwhelming" and Gracie Qu of Anitrendz describing it as "unnatural" due to him acting a character that was supposed to be a bilingual.

Notes

References

External links
 Official website 
 Official Twitter 
 

2022 anime television series debuts
Anime composed by Hiroyuki Sawano
Anime with original screenplays
Aniplex
Crunchyroll anime
Horse racing in anime and manga
Lay-duce